Iury Miguel Gomes Negreiros (born 4 September 1998), commonly known as Iury, is a Brazilian footballer who currently plays as a forward for Villa Nova.

Career statistics

Club

Notes

References

1998 births
Living people
Brazilian footballers
Association football forwards
Villa Nova Atlético Clube players
Clube Atlético Patrocinense players